The North–South All-Star Classic was a postseason college football all-star game, the only edition of which took place in 2007. The game was played in Houston at the Galena Park ISD Stadium and telecast on ESPN2.

On January 13, 2007, the North team, led by San Jose State coach Dick Tomey, defeated the South team, coached by Texas Tech coach Mike Leach, 28-17.  Galena Park ISD had a two-year agreement to host the game. The second annual edition of the game was tentatively scheduled for January 12, 2008, but was cancelled. The game was sponsored by Inta Juice, an energy drink.

Game results

2007: North 28, South 17

See also
List of college bowl games

References

College football all-star games
2007 in sports in Texas
American football competitions in Houston